Hiller is a surname. Notable people with the surname include:

 Matthias Hiller (1646–1725), German Protestant theologian and philologist
 Philip Frederick Hiller (1699–1769), German Evangelical parson and hymnwriter
 Johann Adam Hiller (1728–1804), German composer
 Johann von Hiller (1754–1819), Austrian general
 Friedrich Adam Hiller (c. 1767–1812), German composer, son of Johann Adam Hiller
 Ferdinand Hiller (1811–1885), German composer (born Ferdinand Hildesheim)
 H. Gustave Hiller (1865–1946), artist and stained glass designer
 Hiram M. Hiller, Jr. (1867–1921), American physician and ethnographer
 Lejaren Hiller Sr. (1880–1969), American photographer and illustrator
 Arthur Hiller (1881–1941), German football player
 Kurt Hiller (1885–1972), German socialist writer
 Marius Hiller (1892–1964), German football player
 Hob Hiller (1893–1956), American baseball player
 Wendy Hiller (1912–2003), English actress
 Arthur Hiller (1923–2016), Canadian film director
 Lejaren Hiller (1924–1994), American composer
 Stanley Hiller (1924–2006), one of the early developers of the helicopter
 Tony Hiller (1927–2018), English songwriter and record producer
 Chuck Hiller (1934–2004), American baseball player
 John Hiller (born 1943), Canadian former baseball pitcher
 Kit Hiller (born 1948), Australian linocut printer and oil painter
 Holger Hiller, (born 1956), German musician
 István Hiller (born 1964), Hungarian politician
 Jim Hiller (born 1969), ice hockey coach and retired player
 Jonas Hiller (born 1982), Swiss ice hockey goalkeeper
 Scott Hiller (fl. 1991–1999), American lacrosse coach

English toponymic surnames